Patrick Lloyd Daley (born March 27, 1959) is a French-Canadian former professional ice hockey player who played 12 games in the National Hockey League.  He played with the Winnipeg Jets. Daley was born in Marville, France, but grew up in Chatham, New Brunswick. Internationally he represented Canada in the 1978 World Junior Ice Hockey Championships, and later his birth country, France, in the 1986 and 1987 World Championships.

Career statistics

Regular season and playoffs

International

External links

1959 births
Living people
Brest Albatros Hockey players
Canadian expatriate ice hockey players in France
Canadian expatriate ice hockey players in the United States
Canadian ice hockey left wingers
Diables Noirs de Tours players
Dragons de Rouen players
Fredericton Express players
French ice hockey left wingers
Ice hockey people from New Brunswick
Laval National players
Montreal Juniors players
People from Miramichi, New Brunswick
Rapaces de Gap players
Tulsa Oilers (1964–1984) players
Winnipeg Jets (1979–1996) draft picks
Winnipeg Jets (1979–1996) players